The 2004 IIHF World U18 Championship Division II was a pair of international under-18 ice hockey tournaments run by the International Ice Hockey Federation. The Division II tournaments made up the third level of competition at the 2004 IIHF World U18 Championships. The Group A tournament took place between 28 March and 3 April 2004 in Debrecen, Hungary and the Group B tournament took place between 1 and 7 March 2004 in Elektrėnai and Kaunas, Lithuania. Ukraine and Great Britain won the Group A and Group B tournaments respectively and gained promotion to Division I for the 2005 IIHF World U18 Championships. While Belgium finished last in Group A and Australia last in Group B and were both relegated to Division III for 2005.

Group A tournament
The Group A tournament began on 28 March 2004 in Debrecen, Hungary. Belgium, Hungary, the Netherlands and Spain returned to compete in the Division II competition after missing promotion at the previous years World Championships. Ukraine entered the Division II competition after being relegated from Division I and Iceland entered the tournament after gaining promotion from Division III at the 2003 IIHF World U18 Championships. Ukraine won the tournament after winning all five of their games and gained promotion back to Division I for the 2005 IIHF World U18 Championships. Hungary finished in second place and the Netherlands finished in third. Belgium finished in last place after losing four of their five games and were relegated to Division III for the 2005 IIHF World U18 Championships. Yegor Yegorov of Ukraine finished as the top scorer of the tournament with 18 points including six goals and 12 assists. Martijn Maghielse of the Netherlands finished as the tournaments leading goaltender with a save percentage of 88.46.

Standings

Fixtures 
All times local.

Scoring leaders
List shows the top ten ranked skaters sorted by points, then goals.

Leading goaltenders
Only the top five goaltenders, based on save percentage, who have played 40% of their team's minutes are included in this list.

Group B tournament
The Group B tournament began on 1 March 2004 in Elektrėnai and Kaunas, Lithuania. Croatia, Estonia and Lithuania all returned to compete in the Division II tournament after missing promotion to Division I at the previous years World Championship. Great Britain entered the Division II competition after being relegated from Division I and Australia entered the tournament after gaining promotion from Division III at the 2003 IIHF World U18 Championships. The Serbia and Montenegro men's national under-18 ice hockey team made their debut at the World Championships after replacing the Yugoslavia men's national under-18 ice hockey team, the change in team coinciding with the Federal Republic of Yugoslavia being reconstituted as the State Union of Serbia and Montenegro. Great Britain won the tournament after winning all five of their games and gained promotion back to Division I for the 2005 IIHF World U18 Championships. Estonia finished second after losing only to Great Britain and Croatia finished in third place. Australia finished in last place after losing four of their five games and drawing the fifth and were relegated back to Division III for the 2005 IIHF World U18 Championships. Thomas Carlon of Great Britain finished as the top scorer of the tournament with 14 points including ten goals and four assists.

Standings

Fixtures 
All times local.

Scoring leaders
List shows the top ten ranked skaters sorted by points, then goals.

References

IIHF World U18 Championship Division II
IIHF World U18 Championship Division II
2004 IIHF World U18 Championships
IIHF World U18 Championship Division II
International ice hockey competitions hosted by Hungary
International ice hockey competitions hosted by Lithuania